This is the discography of the New Orleans rap group Big Tymers.

Discography

Studio albums

Singles

Collaboration singles

Guest appearances
1997: "Get Your Shine On" (B.G feat. Big Tymers)
1997: "Don't Hate Me" (B.G feat. Big Tymers)
1997: "Stay N Line Hoe" (B.G feat. Big Tymers)
1998: "Flossin' Season" (Juvenile feat. Big Tymers, B.G. & Lil' Wayne)
1998: "U.P.T." (Juvenile feat. Hot Boys & Big Tymers)
1998: "Off Top" (Juvenile feat. Big Tymers)
1999: "Loud Pipes" (Lil' Wayne feat. B.G., Big Tymers, Juvenile)
1999: "Young Playa" (Lil' Wayne feat. Big Tymers)
1999: "Not Like Me" (Lil' Wayne feat.B.G., Paparue, Big Tymers)
1999: "Something Got 2 Shake" (Juvenile feat. Big Tymers)
1999: "Lil Boyz" (Juvenile feat. Big Tymers & Lil Wayne)
1999: "With the B.G" (B.G feat. Big Tymers)
1999: "Bling Bling" (B.G feat. Juvenile, Lil Wayne, Turk & Big Tymers)
1999: "Choppers" (Project Pat feat. B.G. & Big Tymers)
1999: "Ballers" (Outro) (Cash Money Remix) (Project Pat feat. Big Tymers, Hot Boys & Tear Da Club Up Thugs)
1999: "Geto Starz" (C-Note feat. Big Tymers)
2000: "Change The World" (B.G. feat. Big Tymers, Juvenile & Lil Wayne)
2000: "Hennessy & XTC" (B.G feat. Big Tymers)
2000: "Pimps, Playas 'N' Hustlers" (Chino Nino feat. Big Tymers)
2000: "Millionaire" (DJ Clue feat. Big Tymers, Hot Boys)
2001: "Sunshine" (Juvenile feat. Big Tymers, B.G. & Lil Wayne)
2001: "Be Gone" (Juvenile feat. Big Tymers)
2002: "Way of Life" (Lil Wayne feat. Big Tymers & TQ)
2002: "Party Like A Thug" (Tank feat. Big Tymers)
2002: "Give It Back" (Toni Braxton feat. Big Tymers)

References

External links
 MTV Big Tymers page

Hip hop discographies
Discographies of American artists